David High Hutcheson (29 October 1892 – 1962) was a Scottish footballer who played in the Football League for South Shields.

References

1892 births
1962 deaths
Scottish footballers
Association football midfielders
English Football League players
Dundee North End F.C. players
Dundee F.C. players
Gateshead A.F.C. players